Derrick Jones Amaniampong (born March 3, 1997) is a professional soccer player who plays as a midfielder for Major League Soccer club Charlotte FC. Born in Ghana, he represented the United States national under-23 team.

Youth 
Born in Bantama, Ghana, Jones and his family moved to Philadelphia, Pennsylvania in 2012 when he was 14.  After arriving in Philadelphia, Jones began playing with Junior Lone Star FC, a club team founded by immigrants from West Africa living in Philadelphia.  In 2013 Junior Lone Star played a friendly against the Philadelphia Union U-18s. The Union's academy director Tommy Wilson was at the game and was impressed with what he saw from Jones.  A few days after the game, Jones joined the Union Academy and began playing with the U-16s. The following season, Jones was promoted to the U-18s.

Club career

Bethlehem Steel 
On December 3, 2015, Jones signed with Bethlehem Steel FC, the Philadelphia Union's USL affiliate, becoming their first-ever player signing.  He made his debut for Steel FC on April 3, 2016, in a 2–1 loss to FC Cincinnati.  On April 17 Jones scored his first goal for Bethlehem in a 2–1 win against the Richmond Kickers.  He scored in the 84th minute on May 15 to give Steel a 2–1 victory over FC Montreal.

Philadelphia Union 
On July 26, 2016, Jones signed a Homegrown Player contract with the Philadelphia Union, the 4th in team history.  After signing to the Union, he remained with Philadelphia's USL affiliate Bethlehem Steel for the rest of the 2016, ending the season with 5 goals and 3 assists from 26 appearances for Bethlehem.

On March 5, 2017, Jones made his Union debut in Philadelphia's opening match of the 2017 MLS season, a 0–0 draw with the Vancouver Whitecaps.  He scored his first goal for the Union on June 15 in a 3–1 victory over the Harrisburg City Islanders in a U.S. Open Cup match.  Jones ended the regular season with 12 appearances for Philadelphia as the Union finished 8th in the Eastern Conference, failing to qualify for the MLS Cup Playoffs.  He also played for the Bethlehem Steel throughout the season, making 11 appearances and scoring once during the USL regular season while also playing once in the USL playoffs.

During the 2018 season, Jones once again split his time between the Union and Steel FC.  He made 12 MLS regular season appearances for the Union, helping them finish 6th in the East and qualify for the playoffs.  He made a substitute appearance in Philadelphia's one playoff match, a 3–1 loss to NYCFC. He also made 3 appearances and had 1 assist in the Open Cup play as he helped the Union reach the final, where they lost 3–0 to the Houston Dynamo, with Jones making a substitute appearance in the final. Jones also made 14 appearances and scored 4 goals for Bethlehem Steel.  During the USL Playoffs, Bethlehem would reach the semifinals, but Jones did not appear in any of the playoff games.

In 2019, Jones made 2 appearances for Philadelphia and 3 for Bethlehem before being traded.

Nashville SC 
On May 9, 2019, Jones was traded to 2020 MLS expansion club Nashville SC in exchange for $175,000 in General Allocation Money.  For the remainder of the 2019 season, Jones was loaned to USL Championship club Nashville SC.  While the MLS and USL teams have the same name, have similar colors, and share some personnel, they are considered to be different franchises.  He made his debut for Nashville (USL) on May 14, in a 3–2 win over South Georgia Tormenta FC 2 in a U.S. Open Cup match. On May 29, Jones suffered a broken ankle in a match with the Charleston Battery, causing him to miss over 3 months of the season.  He ended the regular season with 6 regular season appearances for Nashville, helping them qualify for the playoffs.  On October 26, Jones came off the bench and scored in Nashville's first playoff game, a 3–1 victory against Charleston.  He made another substitute appearance in their next playoff match, a 1–0 loss to Indy Eleven.

On August 12, 2020, Jones made his debut for Nashville SC in a 1–0 win against FC Dallas.  He ended the shortened season due to the COVID-19 pandemic with 18 appearances and 2 assists in the regular season, helping Nashville qualify for the playoffs.  Jones made substitute appearances in all 3 of Nashville's playoff games, helping them reach the conference semifinals, where they lost 2–0 to Toronto FC.

Houston Dynamo 
On January 21, 2021, Jones was traded to the Houston Dynamo in exchange for $250,000 in General Allocation Money.  He made his Dynamo debut on April 16, coming on as a substitute in a 2–1 win over the San Jose Earthquakes.  On May 12, Jones picked up an assist in a 1–0 win against Sporting Kansas City.  He ended the season with 20 appearances and 1 assist as the Dynamo finished last in the Western Conference, missing out on the playoffs.

Jones did not appear in Houston's first 2 games of the 2022 season prior to being traded.

Charlotte FC 
On March 9, 2022, Jones was traded to Charlotte FC along with $50,000 in 2023 GAM in exchange for $250,000 in 2022 GAM.

International career
Jones grew up in Ghana but has dual citizenship with the United States, having moved to the country when he was 14 years old. Jones represented Ghana at U15 level but accepted a call up to represent the U.S.A. U20 in October 2016.   He played for the U.S. at the 2017 FIFA U-20 World Cup, making 4 appearances as the Americans reached the quarterfinals.

Career statistics

References

External links 
 
 Bethlehem Steel FC player profile

1997 births
Living people
American soccer players
Association football midfielders
Philadelphia Union II players
Ghanaian footballers
Ghanaian emigrants to the United States
Major League Soccer players
Philadelphia Union players
Nashville SC (2018–19) players
Soccer players from Philadelphia
USL Championship players
United States men's under-20 international soccer players
United States men's under-23 international soccer players
Nashville SC players
Homegrown Players (MLS)
Houston Dynamo FC players
Charlotte FC players